Capo Vaticano is a wide bathing place in the Municipality of Ricadi in Calabria, Italy. The 'Cape' is formed by a particular white-gray granite, which is examined worldwide for its geologic characteristics.

Geography

The maximum altitude of the cape is about 124 meters.

The coast of Capo Vaticano starts from Santa Maria beach up to Tonicello beach. The most suggestive bays near the Cape are Praia I Focu and Grotticelle.

History
The famous Venetian writer Giuseppe Berto made Capo Vaticano his home, after travelling throughout Italy. "Capo Vaticano", he wrote, "is called Vatican as a Roman hill: once priests and fortune tellers searched for the future basing their predictions on birds' flights. 200 meters over the Cape there is a rock called Mantineo and in ancient Greek it means: to communicate with God. The Cape was a holy place and now it is the same".

Economy
Capo Vaticano is considered the ideal place to have the climate suitable for growing the Red onions of Tropea.

See also
Capo Vaticano Lighthouse

References

External links
 Capo Vaticano

Vaticano
Landforms of Calabria
Province of Vibo Valentia
Landforms of the Tyrrhenian Sea
Frazioni of the Province of Vibo Valentia